War In Wonderland is an album released in 2006 by an Estonian industrial metal band No-Big-Silence.

It consists of songs recorded from 2002 to 2006. It did well on release.

"Robot Super Lover Boy", "War In Wonderland" and more recently "The Outer Suns" were released as singles from the album.

The entire album can be played on the band's website.

Track listing
 "Gore Gore Girls" – 3:37
 "She's Got Hyper Power" – 4:08
 "Dreamriders" – 4:19
 "Diabolic Speed" – 3:13
 "Robot Super Lover Boy" – 3:33
 "The Outer Suns" – 4:09
 "Red Sky" – 4:25
 "War In Wonderland" – 4:05
 "Psycho Creeping" – 3:43
 "My Tears Are Fire" – 5:33

Personnel
Vocals - Cram
Bass, backing vocals, guitar - Willem
Guitar, keyboards, programming and bass - Kristo K
Drums - Kristo R
Editing, mixing - Kristo Kotkas
Producing - No-Big-Silence
Mastering - Tom Baker
Additional vocals and voices - Kaire Vilgats, Hele Kõre, Evelin Pang, Kristiina and Kalev
Artwork - Harijis Brants
Layout - Harijis Brants and Jensen

2006 albums
No-Big-Silence albums